Hammond is the largest city in Tangipahoa Parish, Louisiana, United States, located  east of Baton Rouge and  northwest of New Orleans. Its population was 20,019 in the 2010 U.S. census, and 21,359 at the 2020 population estimates program. 

Hammond is home to Southeastern Louisiana University. It is the principal city of the Hammond metropolitan statistical area, which includes all of Tangipahoa Parish and is a part of the New Orleans-Metairie-Hammond combined statistical area.

History

19th century
The city is named for Peter Hammond (1798–1870), the surname anglicized from Peter av Hammerdal (Peter of Hammerdal) — a Swedish immigrant known as the first European settler, arriving around 1818. Peter, a sailor, had been briefly imprisoned by the British at Dartmoor Prison during the Napoleonic Wars. He escaped during a prison riot, made his way back to sea, and later reached New Orleans. 

Hammond used his savings to buy then-inexpensive land northwest of Lake Pontchartrain. He developed a plantation to cultivate trees, which he made into masts, charcoal, and other products for the maritime industry in New Orleans. He transported the goods by oxcart to the head of navigation on the Natalbany River at Springfield. He held at least 30 enslaved African Americans before the Civil War. Hammond lost his wealth during the war, as Union soldiers raided his property.

In 1854, the New Orleans, Jackson and Great Northern Railroad (later the Illinois Central Railroad, now Canadian National Railway) came through the area, launching the town's emergence as a commercial and transport center. The point where the railroad met the trail to Springfield was at first known as Hammond's Crossing.

During the Civil War, the city was a shoe-making center for the Confederate States Army. Charles Emery Cate developed the shoe industry after buying land in the city in 1860 for his home, a shoe factory, a tannery, and a sawmill. Toward the end of the war, Cate laid out the town's grid, using the rail line as a guide and naming several of the streets after his sons. Also, Cate Street is named for him.

After the Civil War, light industry and commercial activities were attracted to the town.  By the end of the 19th century, Hammond had become a stopping point for northern rail passengers traveling south and for New Orleanians heading north to escape seasonal summer yellow fever outbreaks. The city later became a shipping point for strawberries. A state historical plaque downtown marks it as "Strawberry Capital of America".

20th and 21st centuries
In the 1920s, David William Thomas edited a weekly newspaper in Hammond prior to moving to Minden, the seat of Webster Parish. There, he was elected mayor in 1936. 

In 1932, Hodding Carter founded the Hammond Daily Courier, which he left in 1939 to move to Greenville, Mississippi. The paper closed. Carter later received a Pulitzer Prize for his reporting on the Civil Rights Movement. 

In 1944, the Tangipahoa Parish Library – Hammond branch was established. 

Since 1959, The Daily Star has been Hammond's locally published daily newspaper.

During World War II, the Hammond Airport (now Hammond Northshore Regional Airport) served as a detention camp for prisoners of war from Nazi Germany. 

Additionally, the U.S. Army established and used the  Hammond Bombing and Gunnery Range east of the city. In the early 21st century, Army Corps of Engineers searched for remaining explosives in this area.

Today, Hammond is intersected by Interstates 12 and 55. Its airport has a long runway which serves as a backup landing site for Louis Armstrong New Orleans International Airport. It is also a major training site for the Louisiana Army National Guard, and the home base for the Louisiana Air National Guard's 236th Combat Communications Squadron. 

The combination of highway-rail-air-sea transportation has transformed modern Hammond from a strawberry capital to a transportation capital. The city hosts numerous warehouses and is a distribution point for Walmart and other major businesses. Southeastern Louisiana University in Hammond offers the state's only academic degree in supply chain management.

In 1953, John Desmond opened the first architectural firm in Hammond.  He was chief architect of the Tangipahoa Parish School Board for some two decades before he relocated to Baton Rouge.

Among the city's cultural resources is the Tangipahoa African American Heritage Museum. This is one of the destinations on the Louisiana African American Heritage Trail. Southeastern took over the Columbia Theatre in the designated Hammond Historic District to use as a downtown cultural venue. The former movie theater was constructed in 1928 and renovated by the university in the 1990s for $5.6 million.

The city was the base for production of the first season of the NBC television series In the Heat of the Night, starring Carroll O'Connor and airing in 1988. This series was adapted from the 1967 film of the same name.

On August 29, 2021, Hammond suffered a direct strike by the eastern eyewall of Hurricane Ida.

Geography

Climate
The climate in this area is characterized by hot, humid summers and generally mild to cool winters. According to the Köppen climate classification system, Hammond has a humid subtropical climate, Cfa on climate maps.

Demographics

As of the 2020 United States census, there were 19,584 people, 6,871 households, and 3,972 families residing in the city.

Education

Southeastern Louisiana University (SLU), based in Hammond, is one of the state's regional universities and one of the city's largest employers. It was established in 1925 through the efforts of the educator Linus A. Sims, then principal of Hammond High School. The city is also home to Northshore Technical Community College. There are also two vocational colleges in the city, Petra College and Compass Career College, both of which offer allied health and medical certifications.

The city's public schools are part of the Tangipahoa Parish School System and include Hammond High Magnet School, Hammond Junior High, Eastside Elementary, Westside Elementary, SLU Laboratory School, and Crystal Academy (an alternative school).

The Catholic Church operates two schools in Hammond: Holy Ghost Catholic School (pre-kindergarten through 8th grades) and Saint Thomas Aquinas High School, which is just north of the city. In addition, Trafton Academy (pre-K through 8th) and Oaks Montessori School (pre-K through 8th) are private schools serving area students.

In 2018, press reports indicated that only 74% of the local population held high school diplomas. In this respect, Hammond ranks among the bottom 25 cities nationally and is comparable to Salem, Oregon, and Tucson, Arizona. With only 20% of people having a college degree, the city was in the bottom quarter nationwide in this ranking too. Schools in this district are ranked in the lower 50% of public schools in the state.

The TPPS had 19,500 students enrolled for the 2020-2021 academic year and an annual budget of $219 million.

Sports, parks, and recreation
The Southeastern Louisiana Lions sports teams use multiple venues in Hammond. Chappapeela Sports Park hosts American football, baseball, basketball, lacrosse, soccer, softball and volleyball.

There are a few public parks in Hammond including Cate Square park, Zemurray Park, North Oaks Park, Mooney Avenue Park, Clarke Park, Martin Luther King Park, Jackson Park, and Hammond Dreamland Park. There is a public pool located at Zemurray Park. In addition to youth recreational sports and camps, there are adult flag football, basketball, kickball, and volleyball leagues. Other programs are available for adults including Line Dancing, Zumba, and Crafting.

Media
Hammond is overlapped by most of the mass media in Baton Rouge and New Orleans, although over-the-air television reception is available. The city has the following news and entertainment media of its own:
 Action News 17 area Charter Communications Channel 197: virtual television internet streaming freely available at the Action News 17 site
 Daily Star newspaper
 KSLU FM 90.9 (Southeastern Louisiana University)
 WZEN-LP FM 107.9
 WFPR AM 1400
 WHMD FM 107.1 radio (also known as "Kajun Radio")
 WTGG FM 96.5

Government and infrastructure
The Louisiana Office of Juvenile Justice operates the Hammond Office in Hammond.

The United States Postal Service operates the Hammond Post Office.

Law enforcement and crime

Hammond is served by five police agencies:
 Hammond Police Department (HPD) – the main municipal police department of the city
 Tangipahoa Parish Sheriff's Office (TPSO) – the parish level police agency
 Southeastern Louisiana University Police Department (SLUPD) – the police force responsible for law enforcement on all properties owned by SLU
 7th Ward City Court Marshal's Office
 Louisiana State Police (LSP)

The Hammond Police Department is headquartered at 120 S Oak St. The city's uniform crime reporting statistics are available on the FBI UCR website.

Hammond has suffered from exceptionally high crime rates for many years. Louisiana has been ranked the #1 most violent state in the United States, and Hammond is ranked as the most violent city in the state based on crimes per capita.

Crime Rates US Average v Hammond Louisiana

Health care
Hammond and its immediate environs have a number of hospitals, including North Oaks Medical Center on U.S. Route 51 Business between Hammond and Ponchatoula. North Oaks is one of the largest hospitals in Louisiana and helps serve the teaching needs of Southeastern Louisiana University's College of Nursing & Health Sciences.

Transportation

Hammond has railways, highways (including the intersection of two interstates), and air travel/transport.

Passenger rail

Both the southbound and northbound daily City of New Orleans schedules have afternoon stops in Hammond, so Amtrak Superliner trains are a common sight. About 15,000 passengers use the station every year.

The Queen Anne-style station (1912), situated at the center of town, was renovated in 2008, with an ADA-compliant platform added soon after that.

Highways
Part of Hammond's success is due to its location at the junction of two heavily traveled interstate highways:

  Interstate 12, from Baton Rouge to Slidell, is a shortcut for Interstate 10 drivers to avoid congestion in New Orleans.
  Interstate 55, from Laplace (west of New Orleans) to Chicago, also passes through Jackson, Mississippi, Memphis, and St. Louis.

Two U.S. highways serve the city:

  U.S. Route 51 (Morrison Boulevard) splits from I-55 between Hammond and Ponchatoula and parallels I-55 northward through the city's western side. U.S. 51 Business, which follows the original route of U.S. 51, leaves the parent 51 south of Ponchatoula and rejoins it after meeting US 190 in downtown Hammond and forming a concurrency with 190 until it meets US 51.
  U.S. Route 190 (Thomas Street / Morris Avenue) parallels I-12 and goes east–west through the city's commercial and historic downtown areas.

State highways serving the area include:

  LA 443 (Morris Road)
  LA 1040 (Chauvin Drive and Old Baton Rouge Highway)
  LA 1064 (Natalbany Road, River Road)
  LA 1065 (North Cherry Street)
  LA 1067 (Old Covington Highway)
  LA 1249 (Pumpkin Center Road)
  LA 3158 (Airport Road)
  LA 3234 (University Avenue, continuation of Wardline Road, serving Southeastern Louisiana University)
  LA 3260 (West Church Street Extension)

Airport
The Hammond Northshore Regional Airport has a runway long enough to land the Concorde (1976–2003) and to serve as back-up for Louis Armstrong New Orleans International Airport. The largest unit of the Louisiana Army National Guard is stationed at Hammond, adjacent to the site.  The airport is also the home base for the 236th Combat Communications Squadron of the Louisiana Air National Guard.

The airport has no regularly scheduled passenger service but is convenient for charter flights and corporate aviation purposes.

Notable people

 Robert Alford, cornerback for Arizona Cardinals
 Kayla Ard, Head Coach for Utah State University Women's Basketball
 George W. Bond, fourth acting president of Southeastern Louisiana University (1944–1945); former president of Louisiana Tech University (1928–1936)
 George S. Bowman Jr., Major general, U.S. Marine Corps and veteran of World War II, Korea and Vietnam
 Josh Brooks, athletic director for the University of Georgia
 Alyssa Carson, space enthusiast and astronaut hopeful
 Sally Clausen, president of Southeastern Louisiana University, 1995–2001
 Wade Miley, baseball pitcher for Cincinnati Reds
 James H. Morrison, U.S. Representative for Louisiana, 1943–1967
 Jimmy Noone, musician and bandleader
 Cindy Robbins, actress
 Robin Roberts, host of Good Morning America
 Dr. Charles Smith, artist
 Jamie Lynn Spears, actress and country music singer
 Todd O'Neill, singer

In popular media
 "Hammond Song", written by Maggie Roche of The Roches, documents moving to Hammond after becoming disillusioned with the music industry.

Gallery

See also
 The Daily Star newspaper
 National Register of Historic Places listings in Tangipahoa Parish, Louisiana
 Tangipahoa African American Heritage Museum

References

External links

 City of Hammond
 Hammond Chamber of Commerce
 Hammond Historic District
 The Daily Star
 MyHammond–MyPonchatoula directory

 
Cities in Louisiana
Cities in Tangipahoa Parish, Louisiana
Louisiana African American Heritage Trail
Populated places established in 1818
Swedish-American history
Sweden–United States relations
World War II prisoner of war camps in the United States